The Shire of Dowerin is a local government area in the Wheatbelt region of Western Australia, about  northeast of Perth, the state capital.

History
On 3 November 1911, the Dowerin Road District was gazetted. On 1 July 1961, it became a shire following enactment of the Local Government Act 1960.

Wards
Council resolved to dissolve Wards in December 2016.

Towns and localities
The towns and localities of the Shire of Dowerin with population and size figures based on the most recent Australian census:

Former towns
 Amery
 Ejanding

Population

Heritage-listed places
As of 2023, 30 places are heritage-listed in the Shire of Dowerin, of which none are on the State Register of Heritage Places.

References

External links
 

 
Dowerin